"The Day That She Left Tulsa (In a Chevy)" is a song written by Mark D. Sanders and Steve Diamond, and recorded by American country music artist Wade Hayes.  It was released in November 1997 the lead-off single from Hayes' album When the Wrong One Loves You Right.  The song reached number 5 on the Billboard Hot Country Songs chart and number 9 on the Canadian RPM country singles chart. It also peaked at number 86 on the Billboard Hot 100 chart. It was his last top ten single to date.

Content
While riding the Ferris Wheel at a carnival, the narrator's girlfriend reveals that she is pregnant. He takes it for granted at first but realizes that the baby isn't his when she becomes distraught and leaves town without notice. He says that if he had the chance he would have loved her anyway.

Music video
The music video, like most of Wade Hayes' videos, was directed by Steven Goldmann. It begins, just like in the song, with a couple on a Ferris wheel and the woman telling him she's pregnant. She then becomes distraught and drives away. Wade drives around and finds her walking on a bridge. After trying to reconcile with her she gets back in her truck and drives away from him.

Critical reception
In reviewing the album, When the Wrong One Loves You Right, Thom Owens of Allmusic cited this track as "illustrating Hayes' true potential" and as one of the strongest cuts on the album "where the melody, lyric and delivery blend perfectly".

Chart performance
"The Day That She Left Tulsa (In a Chevy)" debuted at number sixty-two on the U.S. Billboard Hot Country Singles & Tracks for the week of November 1, 1997.

Year-end charts

References

1997 singles
Wade Hayes songs
Songs written by Steve Diamond (songwriter)
Songs written by Mark D. Sanders
Song recordings produced by Don Cook
Columbia Records singles
Music videos directed by Steven Goldmann
1997 songs
Songs about pregnancy
Songs about Tulsa, Oklahoma
Songs about cars